HMS Audacious  was the fourth and last  dreadnought battleship built for the Royal Navy in the early 1910s. After completion in 1913, she spent her brief career assigned to the Home and Grand Fleets. The ship was sunk by a German naval mine off the northern coast of County Donegal, Ireland, early during the First World War. Audacious slowly flooded, allowing all of her crew to be rescued and finally sank after the British were unable to tow her to shore. However, a petty officer on a nearby cruiser was killed by shrapnel when Audacious subsequently exploded. Even though American tourists aboard one of the rescuing ships photographed and filmed the sinking battleship, the Admiralty embargoed news of her loss in Britain to prevent the Germans from taking advantage of the weakened Grand Fleet. She is the largest warship ever sunk by naval mines.

Design and description
The King George V-class ships were designed as enlarged and improved versions of the preceding s. Audaciouss crew numbered 860 officers and ratings in 1914.

Ships of the King George V class were powered by two sets of Parsons direct-drive steam turbines, each driving two shafts, using steam provided by 18 Yarrow boilers.

Armament and armour
Like the Orion class, the King George Vs were equipped with 10 breech-loading (BL)  Mark V guns in five hydraulically powered twin-gun turrets. There were a pair of superfiring turrets fore and aft of the superstructure and another amidships, all on the centreline. Their secondary armament consisted of 16 BL  Mark VII guns. Eight of these were mounted in the forward superstructure, four in the aft superstructure, and four in casemates in the side of the hull abreast of the forward main-gun turrets, all in single mounts. The ships were equipped with three 21-inch (533 mm) submerged torpedo tubes, one on each broadside and another in the stern, for which 14 torpedoes were provided.

The King George V-class ships were protected by a waterline  armoured belt that extended between the end barbettes.

Modifications
Audacious was fitted with a fire-control director on the roof of the spotting top before her loss.

Construction and career 

Ordered under the 1910–1911 Naval Estimates, Audacious was the third ship of her name to serve in the Royal Navy. The ship was laid down by Cammell Laird at their shipyard in Birkenhead on 23 March 1911 and launched on 14 September 1912. She was completed in August 1913 at a cost of £1,918,813, but was not commissioned until 15 October, joining her sister ships in the 2nd Battle Squadron. All four sisters represented the Royal Navy during the celebrations of the re-opening of the Kaiser Wilhelm Canal in Germany in June 1914.

World War I
Between 17 and 20 July, Audacious took part in a test mobilisation and fleet review as part of the British response to the July Crisis. Arriving at the Isle of Portland on 25 July, she was ordered to proceed with the rest of the Home Fleet to Scapa Flow off the coast of Scotland four days later to safeguard the fleet from a possible surprise attack by the Imperial German Navy. Following the start of World War I in August, the Home Fleet was reorganised as the Grand Fleet, and placed under the command of Admiral Sir John Jellicoe. The following month, the ship was refitted at HM Dockyard, Devonport, and rejoined the Grand Fleet at the beginning of October.

Sinking 
Repeated reports of submarines in Scapa Flow led Jellicoe to conclude that the defences there were inadequate and he ordered that the Grand Fleet be dispersed to other bases until the defences were reinforced. On 16 October, the 2nd Battle Squadron was sent to Loch na Keal on the western coast of Scotland. The squadron departed for gunnery practice off Tory Island, Ireland, on the morning of 27 October and Audacious struck a mine at 08:45, laid a few days earlier by the German auxiliary minelayer . Captain Cecil Dampier, thinking that his ship had been torpedoed, hoisted the submarine warning; in accordance with instructions the other dreadnoughts departed the area, leaving the smaller ships behind to render assistance.

The explosion occurred  under the bottom of the ship, approximately  forward of the transverse bulkhead at the rear of the port engine room. The engine room and the outer compartments adjacent to it flooded immediately, with water spreading more slowly to the central engine room and adjoining spaces. The ship rapidly took on a list to port of up to 15 degrees, which was reduced by counter-flooding compartments on the starboard side, so that by 09:45, the list ranged up to only nine degrees as she rolled in the heavy swell. The light cruiser  stood by, while Jellicoe ordered every available destroyer and tug out to assist, but did not send out any battleships to tow Audacious because of the supposed submarine threat. Having intercepted the stricken dreadnought's distress calls, the White Star ocean liner , arrived on the scene.

The ship had covered  when the rising water forced the abandonment of the centre and starboard engine rooms and she drifted to a stop at 10:50. Dampier ordered all non-essential crew to be taken off, boats from Liverpool and Olympic assisting, and only 250 men were left aboard by 14:00. At 13:30, Captain Herbert Haddock, the captain of Olympic, suggested that his ship attempt to take Audacious in tow. Dampier agreed, and with the assistance of the destroyer , a tow line was passed 30 minutes later. The ships began moving, but the line snapped as Audacious repeatedly tried to turn into the wind. Liverpool and the newly arrived collier  then attempted to take the battleship in tow, but the lines broke before any progress could be made.

Vice-Admiral Sir Lewis Bayly, commander of the 1st Battle Squadron, arrived on the scene in the ocean boarding vessel Cambria and took over the rescue operation. Upon learning that two ships had been mined in the area the day before, and that there was no threat from submarines, Jellicoe ordered the pre-dreadnought battleship  to sail at 17:00 for an attempt to tow Audacious. Dampier ordered all but 50 men to be removed at 17:00 and Bayly, Dampier and the remaining men on the ship were taken off at 18:15 with dark approaching.

Just as Exmouth was coming up on the group at 20:45, Audacious heeled sharply, paused, and then capsized. She floated upside down with the bow raised until 21:00, when an explosion occurred that threw wreckage  into the air, followed by two more. The explosion appeared to come from the area of 'B' magazine and was probably caused by one or more high-explosive shells falling from their racks and exploding, then igniting the cordite in the magazine. A piece of armour plate flew  and killed a petty officer on Liverpool. This was the only casualty in connection with the sinking.

Aftermath 
Jellicoe immediately proposed that the sinking be kept a secret, to which the Board of Admiralty and the British Cabinet agreed, an act open to ridicule later on. For the rest of the war, Audacious name remained on all public lists of ship movements and activities. The many Americans on board Olympic were beyond British jurisdiction and discussed the sinking. Many photos, and even one moving film, had been taken. By 19 November, the loss of the ship was accepted in Germany. Jellicoe's opposite number in Germany, Reinhard Scheer, wrote after the war, "In the case of the Audacious we approve of the English attitude of not revealing a weakness to the enemy, because accurate information about the other side's strength has a decisive effect on the decisions taken."

On 14 November 1918, shortly after the war ended, a notice officially announcing the loss appeared in The Times:

A Royal Navy review board judged that a contributory factor in the loss was that Audacious was not at action stations, with water-tight doors locked and damage-control teams ready. Attempts were made to use the engine-circulating pumps as additional bilge pumps, but the rapid rise of water prevented this. Although hatches were open at the time of the explosion, it was claimed that all were closed before rising water reached them. Apart from the damage to the bottom of the ship, water was found to have spread through bulkheads because of faulty seals around pipes and valves, broken pipes and hatches which did not close properly.

The wreck of Audacious was filmed for the television show Deep Wreck Mysteries on the History Channel in 2008. The programme featured an investigation of the wreck and the circumstances of its loss by nautical archaeologist Innes McCartney and naval historian Bill Jurens. 'B' turret and part of its barbette were blown clear of the wreck by the explosion.

Citations

Bibliography

External links

 Maritimequest HMS Audacious Photo Gallery 
 Loss of HMS Audacious

 

King George V-class battleships (1911)
Ships built on the River Mersey
1912 ships
World War I battleships of the United Kingdom
World War I shipwrecks in the Atlantic Ocean
Shipwrecks of Ireland
Ships sunk by mines
Maritime incidents in October 1914
Maritime incidents in Ireland
Military deception
Naval magazine explosions